Quinn Carpenter (born February 24, 1996) is an American retired ice dancer. With his former skating partner, Lorraine McNamara, he is the 2018 Grand Prix of Helsinki bronze medalist, a three-time silver medalist on the ISU Challenger Series, and the 2019 U.S. national pewter medalist. Earlier in their career, they became the 2016 World Junior champions, the 2015 JGP Final champions, and two-time U.S. national junior champions.

Personal life 
Quinn Carpenter was born February 24, 1996, in Bethesda, Maryland. He was homeschooled before enrolling at Montgomery College in Rockville, Maryland, where he is studying mechanical engineering. He currently resides in North Bethesda, Maryland.

Career 
Carpenter's parents introduced him to ice skating when he was two or three years old. He joined Alexei Kiliakov and Elena Novak at the Wheaton Ice Dance Academy at age six. Carpenter skated one season with his first partner.

Carpenter began skating with Lorraine McNamara in 2005. They won the junior bronze medal at the 2012 U.S. Championships but McNamara was too young to be sent to the 2012 World Junior Championships.

2012–2013 season 
McNamara/Carpenter became age-eligible for junior internationals. In August 2012, they finished sixth in their Junior Grand Prix (JGP) debut, in Courchevel, France. They placed fourth the following month at their second JGP assignment, in Istanbul, Turkey. After winning the junior bronze medal at the U.S. Championships, McNamara/Carpenter were assigned to the World Junior Championships in Milan. They placed 8th in the short dance, 11th in the free dance, and 9th overall in Italy.

2013–2014 season 
McNamara/Carpenter won their first international medals during the 2013–14 JGP series, taking silver in Riga, Latvia and then gold in Minsk, Belarus. Their results qualified them to the JGP Final in Fukuoka, Japan, where they won the bronze medal. The duo won the junior silver medal at the 2014 U.S. Championships and finished fourth at the 2014 World Junior Championships in Sofia, Bulgaria, after placing third in the short dance and fifth in the free dance.

2014–2015 season 
In the 2014–15 JGP series, McNamara/Carpenter won bronze in Ostrava, Czech Republic and silver in Dresden, Germany, finishing as second alternates for the JGP Final. In January 2015, they won the junior titles at the Toruń Cup and then at the 2015 U.S. National Championships. In March, they were awarded the silver medal at the 2015 World Junior Championships in Tallinn, Estonia. Third in both segments, they finished second overall to Russia's Anna Yanovskaya / Sergey Mozgov by a margin of 9.09 points and ahead of Ukraine's Oleksandra Nazarova / Maxim Nikitin by 0.82.

2015–2016 season 
McNamara/Carpenter won gold at both of their 2015–16 JGP assignments, in Colorado Springs, Colorado, and Toruń, Poland. In December 2015, they were awarded gold at the 2015–16 JGP Final, outscoring silver medalists Alla Loboda / Pavel Drozd by over eight points. In January 2016, they won their second national junior title, finishing ahead of Rachel Parsons / Michael Parsons by 4.58 points. In March, they competed at the World Junior Championships in Debrecen, Hungary. Ranked second in the short dance and first in the free dance, McNamara/Carpenter won the gold medal by a margin of 0.91 over the Parsons.

2016–2017 season 
In their final season on the junior level, McNamara/Carpenter won gold in both of their 2016-17 JGP assignments in Ljubljana, Slovenia and Ostrava, Czech Republic. They went on to finish third at the 2016-17 Junior Grand Prix Final. They also finished third at the 2017 U.S. National Championships.

Competing in what would be their final Junior World Championships, they placed seventh in the short dance after receiving only a Level 1 on their step sequence. Carpenter had trouble with her twizzles in the free dance, placing them sixth in that segment, and remaining in seventh place overall.

2017–2018 season 
Making their senior international debut, McNamara/Carpenter won the Lake Placid Ice Dance International.  Initially assigned to two Challenger series events, they placed fifth at the 2017 CS Autumn Classic International and eight at the 2017 CS Finlandia Trophy.  They then made their Grand Prix debut, placing fifth at the 2017 Cup of China. Reflecting on the transition to the senior ranks, Carpenter remarked "we knew we didn't have anything to lose, so we threw out our very best. We will use the experience of getting here and build off of it."  Following the Grand Prix they competed at a third Challenger, and won the silver medal at the 2017 CS Warsaw Cup.

Competing as seniors domestically, they placed sixth at the 2018 U.S. Championships.  As the top three American teams were assigned to the Olympic team, McNamara/Carpenter were sent to the 2018 Four Continents Championships in Taipei.  McNamara/Carpenter placed fourth in Taipei, of which McNamara said "I think it went exactly the way we wanted, two strong, clean skates. I think it’s a good debut for us."

2018–2019 season 
In their second senior season, McNamara/Carpenter began by repeating as champions at Lake Placid Ice Dance International.  After winning the silver medal at their first Challenger, the 2018 CS Ondrej Nepela Trophy, they placed fourth at the 2018 Skate America, narrowly missing the podium behind Tiffany Zahorski / Jonathan Guerreiro after coming third in the free dance.  At their second Grand Prix event of the season, they won the bronze medal at the 2018 Grand Prix of Helsinki despite two extended lift deductions in the free dance.  McNamara called their first Grand Prix medal "something to be proud of." Afterward, they competed a second Challenger, the 2018 CS Inge Solar Memorial, where they again won the silver medal.

At their final event of the season, the 2018 U.S. Championships, McNamara/Carpenter placed fourth, earning the domestic pewter medal.

2019–2020 season 
Beginning the season again at the Lake Placid Ice Dance International, McNamara/Carpenter won the bronze medal.  On the Challenger series, they won bronze at the 2019 CS Ondrej Nepela Memorial.  Subsequently, an injury compelled them to withdraw from their first Grand Prix, the 2019 Internationaux de France.  They were able to compete at their second Grand Prix, placing ninth at the 2019 NHK Trophy.

McNamara/Carpenter placed sixth at the 2020 U.S. Championships.  This proved to be their final competitive appearance, as Carpenter announced his retirement from ice dance on April 16, 2020.  McNamara said she would seek to continue skating with a new partner.

Programs 

(with McNamara)

Competitive highlights 
With McNamara

GP: Grand Prix; CS: Challenger Series; JGP: Junior Grand Prix

2012–13 to 2019–20

2006–07 to 2011–12

References

External links 

 
 Lorraine McNamara / Quinn Carpenter at IceNetwork.com

1996 births
American male ice dancers
Living people
People from Bethesda, Maryland
World Junior Figure Skating Championships medalists